Gadzhi Muslimovich Gadzhiyev (born 28 October 1945) is a Russian football manager. He is the president of FC Dynamo Makhachkala.

Managerial career
He was assistant coach to the Soviet Union side which won gold at the 1988 Seoul Olympics, and an assistant coach of the USSR national football team in 1990–1992. His management career has included spells in charge of FC Krylya Sovetov Samara, Sanfrecce Hiroshima (2002) and FC Saturn Moscow Oblast.

Managerial statistics

References

External links
 Club profile 

1945 births
People from Khasavyurt
Living people
Soviet footballers
Expatriate football managers in Japan
J1 League managers
Sanfrecce Hiroshima managers
FC Anzhi Makhachkala managers
Russian football managers
Soviet football managers
Russian Premier League managers
PFC Krylia Sovetov Samara managers
FC Saturn Ramenskoye managers
FC Volga Nizhny Novgorod managers
FC Amkar Perm managers
Russian people of Dagestani descent
Russian expatriate football managers
Association footballers not categorized by position
Sportspeople from Dagestan